Yowla Galdi (also Romanized as Yowlā Galdī) is a city in the Central District of Showt County, West Azerbaijan province, Iran. At the 2006 census, its population was 3,590 in 789 households, when it was a village in the former Showt District of Maku County). The following census in 2011 counted 3,845 people in 898 households, by which time the district had been separated from the county, Showt County established, and divided into two districts: the Central District and Qarah Quyun Districts. The latest census in 2016 showed a population of 3,935 people in 1,041 households. After the census, Yowla Galdi was elevated from village to city status.

References 

Showt County

Cities in West Azerbaijan Province

Populated places in West Azerbaijan Province

Populated places in Showt County